"Can't Stop Lovin' You" is a power ballad by American hard rock band Aerosmith featuring American country recording artist Carrie Underwood that was released on April 6, 2013, as the fourth single from the Aerosmith album Music from Another Dimension!.

Background 
Aerosmith lead singer and songwriter Steven Tyler and frequent collaborator Marti Frederiksen wrote the song with the band during sessions for Music from Another Dimension!. Tyler sang it in an "emotional drawl" similar to the band's 1993 hit "Cryin'" and the song took on a romantic, country sound.

Tyler commented, "When it was done, it was discussed that I might have sang it a little too country. And all along we thought, should we get someone in?" Tyler contacted country singer Carrie Underwood, whom he had collaborated with in recent years, including a duet at a 2012 Country Music Television Special and a performance at the 2011 Academy of Country Music Awards, where Tyler and Underwood performed the Aerosmith classic "Walk This Way" together, as well as Underwood's song "Undo It", which was co-written by Frederiksen. The day Tyler contacted Underwood, she happened to be in town but had to leave the next morning, so Tyler asked her if she could come into record that night, and she agreed.

Response 
About  months after the release of Music from Another Dimension!, "Can't Stop Lovin' You" was released as a single to adult contemporary, hot adult contemporary, and modern radio formats on January 21, 2013. Examiner.com wrote that the song features "country-pop guitar licks and an earworm melody right up Underwood's alley". Aerosmith lead guitarist Joe Perry was initially skeptical of the collaboration with Underwood, but after hearing it, said "Their voices matched up really well. It doesn't sound forced. It was just right."

References

2013 singles
Aerosmith songs
Carrie Underwood songs
Songs written by Steven Tyler
Songs written by Marti Frederiksen
Columbia Records singles
Songs written by Tom Hamilton (musician)
2012 songs
Songs written by Joey Kramer
Songs written by Brad Whitford
Hard rock ballads
Country rock songs